Heart of the West may refer to:

 Heart of the West, a 1907 collection of short stories by O. Henry
 Heart of the West, a 1936 screenplay by Doris Schroeder
 Heart of the West (film), a 1936 American Western film directed by Howard Bretherton and starring William Boyd

See also 

 Hearts of the West (disambiguation)
 Heart of the Golden West, a 1942 American film